Thomas Liam Chamberlain (born 23 May 1996) is an English semi-professional footballer who plays as a striker or a winger for Northern Counties East League Division One club Selby Town.

Career
Born in Scarborough, North Yorkshire, Chamberlain joined York City's youth system as a first-year trainee in 2012. He made his first-team debut on 31 August 2013 aged 17, as an 82nd-minute substitute for Lewis Montrose in a 2–1 away defeat to Exeter City in League Two. He left York in April 2014. After a spell with Northern Counties East League Premier Division club Tadcaster Albion, Chamberlain signed for their divisional rivals Pickering Town on 11 November 2014. He stayed with Pickering for two months before joining Northern Counties East League Division One club Selby Town on 21 January 2015.

Career statistics

References

External links

1996 births
Living people
Sportspeople from Scarborough, North Yorkshire
Footballers from North Yorkshire
English footballers
Association football wingers
Association football forwards
York City F.C. players
Tadcaster Albion A.F.C. players
Pickering Town F.C. players
Selby Town F.C. players
English Football League players
Northern Counties East Football League players